Augustus Lavinus Casely-Hayford  (born 1964) is a British curator, cultural historian, broadcaster and lecturer with ancestral Ghanaian roots in the Casely-Hayford family, a cadet branch of the Cape Coast royal dynasty. 

He is presently the Director of V&A East and was formerly the Director of the Smithsonian National Museum of African Art in Washington, DC. He was appointed an Officer of the Order of the British Empire (OBE) in June 2018 for his services to Arts and Culture. and Professor of Practice at SOAS in 2021. He was commissioned to present a second TV series of Tate Walks for Sky Arts in 2017 featuring David Bailey, Helena Bonham Carter, Billy Connolly, Robert Lindsay, Jeremy Paxman and Harriet Walter. Casely-Hayford was awarded the Leader of the Year for Arts and Media by the Black British Business Awards 2017. He delivered a TED talk in August 2017.  He has been awarded a Cultural Fellowship at King's College, London, and a Fellowship at the University of London's School of Oriental and African Studies (SOAS).

In 2010, as part of the Wonderful Africa Season, he presented Lost Kingdoms of Africa, four 60-minute television programmes for BBC Two and BBC Four; in 2014, the series was broadcast by the French-speaking TV channel Histoire. He was commissioned to present a second series in February 2012. He wrote the book Lost Kingdoms of Africa in 2012, published by Bantam Press. He presented a study of William Hogarth and the 18th century for the television series The Genius of British Art, on Channel 4, in 2010 and hosted The Culture Show for BBC 2 in 2012. In 2016 Casely-Hayford presented the television series Tate Walks for Sky Arts. He is also the author of a book on Timbuktu, published in 2018 by Ladybird/Penguin. In 2022, he hosted a reboot of the long-running archeological television show Time Team.

Early life
Born in London, England, into the prominent Ghanaian Casely-Hayford family, a cadet branch of the royal dynasty of the Cape Coast, Gus Casely-Hayford attended Clayesmore School in Dorset from 1978 to 1980, and went on to gain a PhD in African History from the School of Oriental and African Studies (SOAS), London University. His doctoral thesis was titled "A genealogical history of Cape Coast stool families".

Career 
He is the former executive director of Arts Strategy for Arts Council England. He was previously Director of inIVA (Institute of International Visual Art), a London-based arts organisation with a particular emphasis on international practice, which collaborates with partner venues throughout the UK and worldwide. Prior to this he was the Director of Africa 05, the largest African arts season ever hosted in Britain, involving throughout 2005 more than 150 cultural organisations, including the BBC, the aim of which Casely-Hayford said was to create "sustainable change in the way the art world – and the public – thinks about Africa. ...We don't want this just to be about one year."

He also led the British Museum's diversity programme. He has advised the United Nations and the Canada Council, Council for Culture of the Dutch and Norwegian Arts Councils, and was commissioned to develop the future audience vision for the Tate family of galleries. In 2012 he was a Jury member of the National Open Art Competition and the National Portrait Gallery's BP Portrait Award. In 2013 he was the Chair of the Caine Prize judges. He was chair of the advisory panel for the 2015 British Library exhibition West Africa: Word, Symbol, Song and co-authored the accompanying book of the same title.

He has presented an award-winning South Bank show on African art, produced a documentary on Chris Ofili for Channel 4 and presented several series on African culture for BBC World Service. He has presented Brit Art – Where to Now? for BBC Four. He was a commissioner of arts for the Greater London Authority.

He lectures on world art at Sotheby's, Goldsmiths College and the University of Westminster, and is a consultant for organisations such as the United Nations, the Arts Council and the BBC. He is a Clore Fellow and is a Trustee of the National Trust, a member of English Heritage's Blue Plaque Group and a member of Tate's "Tate for All Board". He is a Judge for  the Art Fund's "Museum of the Year" in 2016. He was formerly a Trustee of the National Portrait Gallery and a Council Member of Tate Britain.  He also sits on the Caine Prize Council and is a spokesperson for the National Archives' Explore Your Archive programme. Casely-Hayford is a supporter of Sense International.

In 2019, he was named as the inaugural director of the forthcoming V&A East in London.

In February 2022, Casely-Hayford was announced as the new presenter of the online revival of Time Team, alongside Natalie Haynes.

Personal life
He is the brother of fashion designer Joe Casely-Hayford, OBE (1956–2019), and of lawyer Margaret Casely-Hayford, and (as son of Victor Casely-Hayford, an accountant who trained as a barrister)<ref>"Casely-Hayford, Margaret Henrietta Augusta", Who's Who 2018.</ref> the grandson of J. E. Casely Hayford (1866–1930), the great Gold Coast thinker, writer and politician. He is married and has one daughter, and as of 2018 the family lived in Washington, DC.

Bibliography
 Co-edited with Janet Topp Fargion and Marion Wallace, West Africa: Word, Symbol, Song (accompanying British Library exhibition of the same name), British Library Publishing Division, 2015. .
 The Lost Kingdoms of Africa: Discovering Africa's hidden treasures, Transworld Publishers, 2012. .
 A genealogical history of Cape Coast stool families. PhD Thesis. London, The School of Oriental and African Studies, 1992.

 References 

External links
 Gus Casely-Hayford, "The Museum as Multi-dimensional Compass in Time and Geography", Brooklyn Rail'' (New York) (September 2021, issue guest-edited by Francesca Pietropaolo).
Biography and appointments
Channel 4
The Lost Kingdoms of Africa Facebook page

"Dr Gus Casely-Hayford on the Lost Kingdoms of Africa" (interview with Peter Moore), Wanderlust.
"This is Britain: Gus Casely-Hayford", Tate, 15 June 2012.
"Writer of the month: In conversation with Dr Gus Casely-Hayford" (podcast), National Archives, 28 February 2013.
"Video: Gus Casely-Hayford on Timbuktu at BBC History Magazine's History Weekend", 5 November 2013.

Augustus
21st-century male writers
1964 births
Alumni of SOAS University of London
Black British television personalities
Black British writers
British art historians
British curators
Directors of the National Museum of African Art
English people of Ghanaian descent
Fante people
Ghanaian people of English descent
Ghanaian people of Irish descent
Living people
People educated at Clayesmore School